90th Street  may refer to:

 90th Street – Elmhurst Avenue (IRT Flushing Line), a local station on the IRT Flushing Line of the New York City Subway
 90th Street (Manhattan), an east–west street in Manhattan, New York City